Sacred Heart High School is a co-educational day school with around 2200 students located in Vashi, Navi Mumbai, a satellite city to the metropolis of Mumbai in Maharashtra, India. It is affiliated to the Maharashtra State Board of Secondary and Higher Secondary Education (MSBSHSE).

Academics 
The school was founded in 1982 under the patronage of the Catholic administration with an aim to impart quality education. Initially only classes from Kindergarten to 6th Standard were operational. Gradually, more classes were introduced. The school now has full-time classes from Kindergarten right up to Standard 10. From the year 2017 on-wards the school has started classes for Standard XI and XII Science and Commerce. 

Besides the mandatory subjects prescribed by MSBSHSE, Sacred Heart High School also has options for Sanskrit.

Currently, it has an audio-visual virtual teaching system in each classroom with teachers fully trained to operate those.

See also 
Schools and Colleges in Navi Mumbai

Catholic secondary schools in India
Primary schools in India
Christian schools in Maharashtra
Private schools in Mumbai
High schools and secondary schools in Mumbai
Education in Navi Mumbai
Educational institutions established in 1982
1982 establishments in Maharashtra